List of A roads in zone 2 in Great Britain starting south of the River Thames and east of the A3 (roads beginning with 2).


Single- and double-digit roads

Triple-digit roads

Four digit roads

 2
2